Milówka can mean:

 Milówka, Silesian Voivodeship
 Milówka, Lesser Poland Voivodeship